Rosenheim station is the main railway station in the city of Rosenheim in Bavaria, Germany. It is the seventh largest passenger station in Bavaria and an important railway hub between the Munich–Rosenheim railway line and the lines to Salzburg, Kufstein/Innsbruck and Mühldorf, as well as the Mangfall Valley Railway. Rosenheim is operated by DB Station&Service, a subsidiary of Deutsche Bahn AG, and is classified as a Category 2 station

History
A first station on the Rosenheim–Kufstein–Innsbruck line, promoted by industrialist Joseph Maffei and King Maximilian II of Bavaria, was opened on 31 October 1857. Located south of the city centre, it soon proved to be too small after the opening of the line to Salzburg in 1860 and the Austrian Brenner Railway in 1867. From 1873 onwards, a new station at the present site was built; it was inaugurated on 19 April 1876. After only 18 years of usage, the old station building was sold to the City of Rosenheim and serves as its town hall (Rathaus) up to today.

The new station, a Neo-Renaissance building, was large enough to cope with the additional traffic on the newly opened line to Mühldorf from 1 May 1876. It was nevertheless rebuilt and enlarged several times during the following decades, including an extended freight yards and a locomotive depot (Bahnbetriebswerk). The premises were severely damaged by strategic bombing in World War II, operations ceased on 20 April 1945.

After the war, the railway connections were restored and a provisional entrance hall was rebuilt by 1950. The present station building was inaugurated on 27 July 1957. From 1967 onwards, corridor trains on the Deutsches Eck railway link, operated by the Austrian Federal Railways (ÖBB), passed through Rosenheim and had to turn back here (while leaving the wagons was prohibited), until from 1982 the so-called "Rosenheim curve" (Rosenheimer Kurve) allowed bypassing the station.

Operational usage 

Rosenheim station is a major railway hub for Regional-Express and Regionalbahn trains in Upper Bavaria, operated by the SüdostBayernBahn network of Deutsche Bahn AG as well as by the private Bayerische Oberlandbahn railway company (Meridian). Every hour trains arrive from Salzburg, Munich, Innsbruck, Kreuzstraße/Holzkirchen and Mühldorf am Inn roughly at the same time and depart a few minutes later.

In addition Eurocity trains from Dortmund and Munich to Verona and Klagenfurt as well as Intercity trains from Hamburg and Frankfurt am Main to Salzburg arrive every two hours and there are occasional night trains to Italy and Austria/Serbia/Hungary. Since 2011, the new ÖBB Railjet high speed train running between Munich and Vienna/Budapest stops at Rosenheim once per day. ÖBB corridor trains from Salzburg to Kufstein and back still pass to the south of the station on the Rosenheim curve.

Many regional and city buses of the local passenger transport executive (RoVG) depart from the station and taxis may be taken from a large taxi stand in front of the station building.

Train services
The station is served by the following services:

RailJet services Munich - Salzburg - Linz - St Pölten - Vienna - Győr - Budapest

See also 
List of scheduled railway routes in Germany

References 

Railway stations in Bavaria
Station
Railway stations in Germany opened in 1876